Primo TV is an American English-language children's television channel operated by V-me Media aimed at the 6-18-year-old Latino market in the United States. The channel launched exclusively through Comcast Xfinity cable systems on January 16, 2017.

Programming

A New Kind of Magic
The Adventures of the Young Marco Polo
Angel's Friends
Angelo RulesAlisa Knows What to Do!Animals at WorkArena eSportsArt OdysseyB-Daman CrossfireBackyard ScienceBeyblade Metal Fusion Bindi's BootcampBlue Water HighBlue ZooBrave WildernessBushwhacked!Captain TsubasaContraptus (fr) Cooler FactsDeadly 360Deadly 60Deadly ArtDeadly Mission MadagascarDeadly Nightmares of NatureDeadly Top 10sDenver, the Last DinosaurDinosaur KingDogs with JobsDude, That's My Ghost!The Elephant PrincessFive @ 305FreefonixFour and a Half FriendsGet AceGet Wild at the San Diego ZooGeneration STEMGGO FootballHow 2Instant StarInvention StoryInvizimalsJamie's Got TentaclesKid DetectivesKids FlixKuu Kuu HarajukuThe Latest BuzzThe LegendariesLeonardoLet's Get Inventin'The Little PrinceLMN's Adventures in the MicroworldLola & VirginiaLoliRockLucky FredMarcus LevelMatt Hatter ChroniclesMe and My RobotMega BitesMirette InvestigatesMiss MoonMondo YanMr. YoungMudpitThe Outsiders ClubPinCodePixel PinkiePumpkin ReportsReal Life 101Really MeRide or WrongScience Max: Experiments at Large!Sindbad & The 7 GalaxiesSissi: The Young EmpressSpeed Racer: The Next GenerationSuckersSuper 4Super Human ChallengeThink BigWacky World BeatersThe Way Things WorkWhat Do You Know?Wicked ScienceThe Wild Soccer BunchWorld Animal ChampionshipWorld TriggerYou're Under ArrestZip Zip''

References

External links
Official website

Children's television networks in the United States
Television networks in the United States
English-language television stations in the United States
Television channels and stations established in 2017
2017 establishments in the United States